An Hour Before Dawn is a lost 1913 silent film detective drama directed by J. Searle Dawley and starring Laura Sawyer and House Peters. It was the fifth of six "Kate Kirby's Cases" detective stories made in 1913, the second produced by the Famous Players Film Company after Dawley and Sawyer left Edison for Famous Players.

Cast
 Laura Sawyer as Kate Kirby
 House Peters as Kate's father, the Ex-Detective
 Edward Earle as Professor Wallace, the Inventor
 William C. Chamberlin as Richard Wallace as the Son

Kate Kirby's cases 
 The Diamond Crown. (Edison – 1913) 
 On the Broad Stairway. (Edison – 1913) 
 The Substitute Stenographer. (Edison – 1913) 
 Chelsea 7750. (Famous Players  - 1913)
 An Hour Before Dawn. (Famous Players  - 1913)
 The Port of Doom. (Famous Players  - 1913)

References

External links
 An Hour Before Dawn at IMDb.com

1913 films
American silent feature films
Lost American films
Films directed by J. Searle Dawley
American black-and-white films
Silent American drama films
1913 drama films
1913 lost films
Lost drama films
1910s American films